Hisao Shinagawa (born 1946) is a Japanese-born songwriter and performer who lives in Los Angeles, California. He is probably best known in his adopted home country for the satirical song "More Money, More War", which became an underground hit after the video aired on "Weird Al" Yankovic's Al TV on MTV in 1984.

Director Masahiro Sugano's 1997 short film HISAO documented Shinagawa's daily life.  The short was nominated for several awards, including a Student Academy Award and IFC2000.

In 2008, Pathfinder Pictures will officially release I Want to Destroy America, Peter I. Chang's full-length documentary about Shinagawa's life.  The film was previously known as Life in G-Chord and was shown at several film festivals, including the Atlanta Underground Film Festival.

References

External links
Hisao at myspace
I Want to Destroy America, AKA Life in G-Chord
Masahiro Sugano's HISAO

1946 births
Living people
Japanese male singer-songwriters
Japanese singer-songwriters